Roman Igorevich Putin (born 10 November 1977) is a Russian businessman and president of the Russian Taekwondo Federation. He is the son of businessman Igor Putin who is a cousin of the Russian President Vladimir Putin.

Early life and education
Roman Putin's grandfather, Alexander, was the uncle of the President of Russia, Vladimir Putin. Putin was born in Ryazan, Russia, in 1977. He is the son of Igor Putin, a Russian businessman and Vladimir Putin's first cousin.

Roman Putin graduated with honors from the Volsk branch of the Military Logistics Academy in 2001, and then for two years worked as an FSB officer.

Career
Between 2006 and 2009 he served as a security adviser to the governor of Ryazan Oblast, where he is credited with restoration of the Voluntary People's Druzhina.

In 2012–2013 he was a non-paid adviser to the governor of Novosibirsk Oblast on social and economic issues. In particular, he proposed and supervised an ambitious project to convert a leading truck repair factory into an assembly plant. He was relieved from his duties when the project failed to materialize, which he attributed to a personal vendetta from the governor. Putin remains an adviser on similar matters to the governor of Yamalo-Nenets Autonomous Okrug.

Roman Putin is the chairman of Group MRT and co-owner of three other Russian companies: Gazstroiholding, Modernizatsiya Rechnogo Transporta (Modernization of River Transport), and Frantsuzskie Aviatsionnye Technologii (French Aviation Technologies). The second company organizes passenger services on the Moscow River aiming to reduce traffic congestions, while the third one produces autogyros.

He is president of the Russian Taekwondo Federation and director of the fund for support and development of higher education Russian Academic Foundation.

Since 2013 Putin is an independent private investment advisor, providing consultancy for investment projects in Russia. In March 2014 Putin founded his own consulting company named Putin Consulting Ltd., that helps foreign investors realize their investment projects in Russia.

Properties and notable purchases
Putin owns a large house in the village of Razdory in Rublyovka. He is also an owner of a 44-acre estate in Napa, California and a villa in London. In September 2015 Putin bought the luxury yacht Silverfast for $90 million during the Monaco Yacht Show. Putin also owns a 38-acre island in the Bahamas which he bought for $75 million.

Politics
In 2020, Roman Putin entered Russian politics. In March Putin announced the creation of the pro-presidential party "People of Business". According to him, he supports the President's policy and would like to assist the government in its positive initiatives. At the same time, he allowed competition with his uncle Vladimir Putin, since the party should have had its own ambitions.

However, he did not create a party. Instead, on 21 June, he joined the existing People Against Corruption party and was elected its leader on 5 July.

References

External links

1977 births
Living people
Russian business executives
People from Ryazan
Family of Vladimir Putin